Ben Paton may refer to:
 Ben Paton (Australian footballer), Australian rules footballer
 Ben Paton (soccer), Canadian soccer player